The 2017–18 Sydney FC W-League season was the club's tenth season in the W-League, the premier competition for women's football in Australia. The team played home games at Allianz Stadium. The club was managed by Ante Juric.

Players

Squad information

Transfers in

Transfers out

Managerial staff 
As of 1 July 2017.

Squad statistics

Competitions

W-League

League table

Results summary

Results by round

Fixtures

Finals series

References

External links 
 Official Website

Sydney FC (A-League Women) seasons
Sydney Fc